Kaniža, Croatia   is a village in Croatia. It is connected by the D35 highway.

Populated places in Varaždin County